Frédéric Lagrange may refer to:

Frédéric Lagrange (politician) (1815–1883), French politician and racehorse owner
Frédéric Lagrange (photographer), French travel and fashion photographer